Dena Michelle Godwin Hernandez is a neurogeneticist. She is head of the genomic technologies group in the laboratory of neurogenetics at the National Institute on Aging.

Hernandez completed a Ph.D. at the UCL Queen Square Institute of Neurology in 2016. Her dissertation was titled Genetic variation and DNA methylation in the context of neurological disease. Hernandez's doctoral advisors were Andrew Singleton and John Hardy.

References

External links 

 
 

Living people
Year of birth missing (living people)
Place of birth missing (living people)
21st-century American women scientists
21st-century American biologists
American women geneticists
American geneticists
Alumni of University College London
National Institutes of Health people
American women neuroscientists
American neuroscientists